Chakkikotha Chankaran is 1989 Malayalam comedy film, made in India, starring Jayaram and Urvashi. The movie is heavily inspired by the 1987 Tamil movie Enga Veettu Ramayanam. The movie was remade in Kannada as Mana Mecchida Sose. It went on to inspire the plot of the 2012 Punjabi movie Carry On Jatta.

Plot
The movie starts with Pradeep (Jayaram) enjoying a cricket match. Raghavan Thampi (Thilakan) and his wife Subhadra (Sukumari) are looking for brides for their sons Prabhakaran (Nedumudi Venu) and Pradeep as an astrologer tells them that they need to have a grandchild quickly or else one of them will die. Prabhakaran is aspiring to become a great Mridangam player, against the wishes of his family, while Pradeep is a bank employee. Subhadra tries to commit suicide in front of Prabhakaran because he refused to marry Shailaja(Geetha), the daughter of Madhava Menon (Adoor Bhasi). Seeing this he finally commits to marry Shailaja. After the marriage Prabhakaran scolds Shailaja very harshly for even small mistakes. One day on the insistence of his parents, Prabhakaran takes Shailaja out for a movie. On the way they encounter some goons who make fun of Prabhakaran who was too afraid to face them. He tries to ignore them but in the end their abuses turned out to be too much for his wife. Shailaja turned out to be a Karate expert. She fights the goons with her saree tucked in. Prabhakaran is stunned when he sees his wife fighting. The goons have no chance in front of Shailaja as her Karate kicks and punches are too good for them. After coming back home Prabhakaran asks Shailaja from where did she learn Karate to which she replies that she had learnt it in her childhood. On the same day at night Shailaja has a dream where she sees that her husband is being attacked by the same goons and she has to again fight them. Pradeep falls in love with Roshini (Urvashi), and they get married secretly in a temple. Pradeep and Roshini marry secretly to hide the marriage from his family. Roshini and Shailaja turned out to be old friends. Hence Roshini takes Pradeep to stay in his own house. After which Pradeep tries every possible trick to get out of the house. He asks his brother for help. Prabhakaran devises a plan in which he will try to prove that Roshini is a thief in front of other family members so that they are thrown out of the house. The plan fails and Prabhakaran himself is caught by the police. He is released after the original thief commits that he is the one who stole the jewellery. In the end Roshini is kidnapped by her stalker. Pradeep goes to save her. But both are caught by the police. The entire family reaches the police station to get him released. During this process some goons who are captured by the constable reach there. One of them takes Shailaja captive. Shailaja beats up the goons using her Karate kicks and punches in a saree. Eventually a bomb blows up the police station but the entire family escapes unhurt.

Cast
Jayaram ... Pradeep Thampi
Nedumudi Venu ...  Prabhakaran Thampi
Thilakan ...  Raghavan Thampi
Urvashi ...  Roshney
Geetha ...  Shailaja
Sukumari ...  Subhadra Kunjamma
Jagathi Sreekumar ...  Ouseppu
Adoor Bhasi ...  Madhava Menon
Lalithasree
Kunchan ...  Police Officer
Bobby Kottarakkara ...  Sankara Pillai
Sankaradi ...  Police Officer
Pattom Sadan
Innocent ... Bhagavathar
Jose

Soundtrack
"Kandittilla(Chandanathin)" - Krishnachandran, K. S. Chithra
"Kandittilla" - Krishnachandran, K. S. Chithra
"Odathe Maane" - Krishnachandran

References

External links
 

1980s Malayalam-language films
1989 comedy films
1989 films
Films scored by Shankar–Ganesh
Malayalam films remade in other languages